Marshall Claxton (12 May 1811 – 28 July 1881) was an English subject, genre, landscape and portrait painter.

Life
Claxton was born in Bolton, Lancashire, the son of a Wesleyan Methodist minister, the Rev. Marshall Claxton, and his wife Diana. Marshall studied under John Jackson, R.A., and at the Royal Academy school where he enrolled on 26 April 1831.

He had his first picture in the Royal Academy in 1832, a portrait of his father. In subsequent years about 30 of his pictures were shown at Academy exhibitions. In 1834 he was awarded the first medal in the painting school, and obtained the gold medal of the Society of Arts in 1835 for his portrait of Sir Astley Cooper. From 1837 to 1842 he worked in Italy and then returned to London, gaining a prize of £100 for his "Alfred the Great in the Camp of the Danes".

In 1850 Claxton went to Sydney, Australia, with a large collection of pictures, but had little success in selling them. While in Sydney he painted a large picture, "Suffer little children to come unto me", a commission from the Baroness Burdett-Coutts. This was described in Household Words as 'the first important picture' painted in Australia.

In September 1854 Claxton left Sydney for Calcutta, where he sold several of his pictures. He returned to England in 1858 via Egypt, and died in London after a long illness on 28 July 1881.

He married and had two daughters, Adelaide and Florence Claxton, both of whom were artists and represented in Royal Academy exhibitions between 1859 and 1867.

Claxton's "General View of the Harbour and City of Sydney" is in the Royal collection in England, and there are two pictures by him in the Dickinson collection in the Art Gallery of New South Wales, Sydney. His portraits of Bishop William Broughton and Dean Cowper are at St. Paul's College, University of Sydney, and that of the Rev. Robert Forrest is exhibited at The King's School, Parramatta. His Godiva painting is in the Herbert Art Gallery and he also has work displayed at the Derby Art Gallery and the Victoria and Albert Museum. He was also known for his depictions of Wesleyan and Methodist subjects, made popular as prints.

Sources

Macmillan, David S.: Claxton, Marshall (1813 - 1881), Australian Dictionary of Biography, Volume 3, MUP, 1969, pp 424–425.

Further reading

External links
Claxton online (ArtCyclopedia)

1811 births
1881 deaths
19th-century English painters
English male painters
British genre painters
English portrait painters
Landscape artists
People from Bolton
19th-century English male artists